Suzan Rose Benedict (November 29, 1873 – April 8, 1942) was the first woman awarded a Ph.D. in Mathematics from the University of Michigan and had a long teaching career at Smith College.

Early life and education

Suzan Benedict was born in Norwalk, Ohio, the youngest of seven children of David DeForrest Benedict, MD and Harriott Melvina Benedict (née Deaver). Dr. Benedict had been a Union Surgeon in the American Civil War. She was a niece of oil magnate and philanthropist, Louis Severance.

After graduating high school in Norwalk, Suzan Benedict entered Smith College in 1891. She graduated in 1895 with a major in Chemistry and minors in Mathematics, German, and Physics, then returned to Norwalk and taught Mathematics until 1905, when she began graduate studies at Teacher's College, Columbia University. She received a M.A. in Mathematics from Columbia in 1906. That same year she joined the Mathematics Department at Smith College as an assistant in Mathematics and rose to become an instructor the following year.

The summers of 1911 through 1913 she resumed her graduate studies at the University of Michigan and in 1913–14 she took a leave of absence from Smith to finish her dissertation directed by Louis Charles Karpinski: “A Comparative Study of the Early Treatises Introducing into Europe the Hindu Art of Reckoning.” She received her PhD in 1914.

Career at Smith College 

Suzan returned to Smith as an associate professor after receiving her PhD. She was promoted to professor in 1921. From 1918 to 1928 she was Dean of Students and she served as chairman of the Mathematics department from 1928 to 1934.

Her first love was teaching. In May 1940 she wrote to Helen Owens, an instructor in mathematics at Pennsylvania State College: "it was not modesty that prevented my sending you a long list of published papers, but a scarcity of such papers. I have lost track of the very few I have written, as I have been much more interested in teaching and administration than in research."

In February 1942 she retired as professor emeritus, intending to support the war effort by volunteering with the Red Cross. Two months later, she was stricken with a heart attack and died.

Suzan Benedict never married. From 1918 she shared a home with Susan Miller Rambo, a colleague in the Mathematics Department at Smith College and the second woman to receive a PhD from the University of Michigan.

Memberships 

 American Mathematical Society
 Mathematical Association of America
 Daughters of the American Revolution

Publications 

 1909: “The Development of Algebraic Symbolism from Paciuolo to Newton.” School Science and Mathematics. Published version of MA thesis.
 1929: “The Algebra of Francesco Ghaligai”, American Mathematical Monthly.

Legacy 

The Suzan R. Benedict Prize was established after her death by the college president and others at Smith College to be awarded to sophomores who had done exceptional work in differential and integral calculus.

References

External links 
 Biographies of Women Mathematicians, Agnes Scott College
 Mathematics Genealogy Project
 A comparative study of the early treatises introducing into Europe the Hindu art of reckoning
 

1873 births
1942 deaths
20th-century American mathematicians
American women academics
Smith College faculty
American women mathematicians
University of Michigan alumni
20th-century women mathematicians
20th-century American women